Aqchay-e Sofla (also Romanized as Āqchāy-e Soflá and Aqchāy Soflá; also known as Āgh Chāy Pā’īn, Akchayl-y, Āqā Chāy-e Pā’īn, and Āq Chāy-e Pā’īn) is a village in Yurchi-ye Sharqi Rural District, Kuraim District, Nir County, Ardabil Province, Iran. At the 2006 census, its population was 207, in 38 families.

References 

Tageo

Towns and villages in Nir County